The Turtle Islands are in the Atlantic Ocean, located west of Sherbro Island in the Southern Province of Sierra Leone. Of the eight islands, seven are inhabited. Sherbro is the predominant ethnic group. Yele, Bakie, Bumpetuk, Chepo, Hoong, Mut, Nyangei and Sei are the names of the islands.

Economic activities
Fishing is the main economic activity. Coconut products and tourism may contribute to the income in a lesser extent.

Traditions
Turtle Islands is a remote destination and the fishing communities have preserved their faith and tradition in a vivid manner. Residents spend their evenings in groups. Sherbros are very social, spending time together drinking and singing traditional songs focused on bravery and romance. One of the eight islands, Hoong, is off limits to visitors or women. Hoong island is reserved for initiated men as part of a rites of passage.

Activities
There is little tourist infrastructure on any of the islands. Visiting this remote area involves considerable planning. Transportation to Turtle islands is erratic and may not always follow safety standards. Most visitors take a 3-hour boat ride from Freetown. Visit Sierra Leone and Daltons Banana Guesthouse operate tours to Turtle Islands.

References

Southern Province, Sierra Leone
Islands of Sierra Leone
Sierra Leonean culture